The LO 120 S is a German parasol-wing, pusher configuration, open-cockpit, two-seats in tandem motor glider that was designed and produced by LO-Fluggerätebau. When it was available it was supplied as a kit for amateur construction and meets European microlight rules.

Design and development
The LO 120 S is of unusual design. Unlike conventional trikes, the aircraft has a tail, of twin-boom configuration with an inverted v-tail. Later models enclosed and faired the cockpit into the wing, making it a high-wing aircraft.

The LO 120 S is of mixed construction, using plywood, metal and composite materials. The specified engine is the Hirth 2704 of  mounted behind the cockpit as a pusher powerplant. The landing gear is tricycle gear.

Specifications (LO 120 S)

See also

References

External links
Photos of LO 120 S
Photo of an LO 120 S

1990s German sailplanes
Homebuilt aircraft
Motor gliders
High-wing aircraft
Single-engined pusher aircraft